Gurbux ("Gurbakhsh") Singh (born 11 February 1936) is a former field hockey player from India who was a member of the India men's national field hockey team that won the gold medal at the 1964 Summer Olympics. He was the Joint Captain at the 1968 Mexico City Olympic Games where India won bronze medal and the Coach to the Indian team at the 1976 Montreal Olympic Games. For his outstanding contribution to the country in the field of sports, Gurbux was given the Arjuna Award in the year 1966.

Early life 

Gurbux Singh was born at Peshawar but he grew up in Rawalpindi, now in Pakistan. After the partition of India, the family first moved over to Lucknow, then to Mhow and finally to Meerut from where Gurbux Singh did his graduation. He moved to Calcutta in 1957, a city which was to ultimately become his permanent home and where his sports career was to take shape. Gurbux initially tried his hand at badminton but then started playing hockey for his school in Lucknow.

Gurbux started hockey at the age of 16. He represented Agra University in 1954–55 and a year later won the Obaidullah Gold Cup Hockey Championship. Gurbux Singh first played in the East Bengal Club in 1957, and was influential in their first victory at the Beighton Cup that year. He later joined Calcutta Customs, for which he played from 1957 to 1965, and played for Mohun Bagan from 1968 to 1980. His career in domestic hockey is highly distinguished, and it is still considered difficult to match his club career record.

International Hockey career 

A skilled full-back player, Gurbux Singh made his international debut in a tour of Australia and New Zealand in 1960, and also participated in the International Hockey Tournament in 1962. By 1963 he was captain, and led the team that won the Gold at the 1966 Asian Games in Bangkok. He was also a member of the 1964 team at the Tokyo Olympics, where India emerged as the champions. He shared captaincy with hockey veteran Prithipal Singh in 1968, where India came in third place.

He retired in 1968, and made his first forays into coaching and umpiring. Gurbux captained the team that won Gold at the 1966 Asian Games in Bangkok. He also led India on a tour to Hamburg Festival, Germany and Japan in 1966, Sri Lanka in 1967 and the Pre-Olympic tournament in London in 1967. He was the Joint Captain, along with Prithipal Singh to the 1968 Olympics in Mexico, where India for the first time had to be content with a Bronze.

After retiring from the international scene in 1968, Gurbux Singh took to coaching and umpiring. He supervised the 1982 Asiad, was the coach of the French team in 1974–75 and trained the Indian team for the 1976 Montreal Olympics. A national selector in 1973 and again from 1980 to 1985, he was the manager of the Indian team to the 1973 World Cup and the 1983 Champions Trophy.

Gurbux Singh was conferred with the Arjuna Award after the Indian team's victory at the 1966 Asian Games. In 2013, he received the Banga Bibhushan, a title instituted by the West Bengal government to honour distinguished achievements in various fields. He was awarded the Lifetime Achievement Award for his outstanding contribution in the field of sports by M.K Narayan, the Governor of West Bengal, in the year 2013. In 2018, he was awarded Bharat Gaurav by East Bengal Club.

He is one of India's most dedicated hockey players, having served the game for over 50 years in various capacities, and is credited for doing much to better the state of Indian hockey, establishing him as a true luminary in Indian Hockey. He was one of the best players in the field of hockey.

See also
 List of Indian hockey captains in Olympics
 Field hockey in India

References

External links

 Sikh Hockey Olympics: Gurbux Singh
 BHA facilitates Gurbux Singh

1936 births
Living people
Indian male field hockey players
Olympic field hockey players of India
Olympic gold medalists for India
Olympic bronze medalists for India
Olympic medalists in field hockey
Medalists at the 1964 Summer Olympics
Medalists at the 1968 Summer Olympics
Field hockey players at the 1964 Summer Olympics
Field hockey players at the 1968 Summer Olympics
Asian Games medalists in field hockey
Field hockey players at the 1966 Asian Games
Recipients of the Arjuna Award
Field hockey players from Kolkata
Punjabi people
Field hockey players from Peshawar
Field hockey players from Rawalpindi
Asian Games gold medalists for India
Medalists at the 1966 Asian Games